Stef Driesen (born 1966, Hasselt, Belgium) is an artist based in Antwerp.

Driesen studied at Academie Voor Schone Kunsten  in Hasselt. He has shown work internationally in exhibitions at Art:Concept  in Paris, Marc Foxx  in Los Angeles, Harris Lieberman in New York City and at MADRE Museum  in Naples. He is represented by Alison Jacques  in London and Marc Foxx in LA.

External links
Stef Driesen at Alison Jacques
Stef Driesen – Painting – Saatchi Gallery

Belgian artists
Living people
1966 births
People from Hasselt